OrfeoGPL is a free Software Document management system. It is GPL licensed and uses open standards. OrfeoGPL is  Language and incorporates the idea of "Fractalize processes" to facilitate the management of any company documents.
OrfeoGPL is a web application development in PHP, which runs on the Apache HTTP Server and it has support for other database PostgreSQL, Oracle and MSSQL, from the customer requiring a browser that meets the standards of W3C as Firefox or Chrome.

OrfeoGPL was originally developed in Colombia. It was registered in 2006 by its creators in the National Registry of Copyrights of National Copyright Directorate with License GPL, so any new development or branch  will remain free.

History 
Orfeo was conceptualized in 2002 by the SUPERINTENDENCIA DE SERVICIOS PÚBLICOS DOMICILIARIOS (SSPD) and contracted to do this development to Denis Lopez, Jairo Hernán Losada and Julian Rolón in collaboration with other engineers.   in Superservicios, putting an early version of the product based on excerpts of code 'DocuImage' (a software that allowed the viewing of documents through the browser), which also worked Jairo Losada.

After the first developments sought a name for the tool and a vote among some users and developers, In 2003 was chosen by a proposal from Julian Rolon: Orfeo, because unlike other proposals such as DOCfile, PAD (Document Management Platform) etc., seeking acronyms, just the explanation of Orfeo (Orpheus) is said "Bard Greek accompanied Jason on the quest for the Golden Fleece" that difference did the fate of the application name.

References

External links 
 Superintendencia de Servicios Públicos Docimiliarios (spanish)
 OrfeoGPL website (spanish)
 Wiki Documentation (spanish)
 CorreLibre Foundation website (spanish)

Free content management systems
Document management systems
Free business software